Floyd Cooper is a former official in the Canadian Football League, originally from Burlington, Ontario.

References

Hamilton Tiger-Cats players
Living people
Year of birth missing (living people)